This is the list of the Hermitage paintings acquired by Andrew W. Mellon during the Soviet sale of Hermitage paintings in 1930–1931 and donated to the National Gallery of Art.

References

Bibliography 
 Selling Russia's Treasures by Nicholas Iljine, Natalia Semenova and Amir G. Kabiri (project directors). MTA Publishing (The M. T. Abraham Foundation), Paris–Moscow, 2013.
 Prodannye Sokrovishcha Rossii (lit. The Sold Treasures of Russia) by Nicholas Iljine and Natalia Semenova (project directors). Russkiy Avantgard publishers, Moscow, 2000.

National Gallery of Art
Hermitage Museum
Lists of paintings